Hold-Up is a Franco-Canadian crime comedy from 1985, starring Jean-Paul Belmondo and directed by Alexandre Arcady. The screenplay by Arcady, Daniel Saint-Hamont and Francis Veber is based on the novel Quick Change by Jay Cronley. The novel was filmed again, as Quick Change (1990), with Bill Murray starring and co-directing.

Plot 
Dressed as a clown, the clever rascal Grimm holds up the most secure bank of Montreal and takes 30 hostages. While confusing and ridiculing the police with his strange behavior, he calmly manages to rid the bank of a fortune. But then an unsatisfied companion arouses trouble...

Cast 
 Jean-Paul Belmondo as Grimm
 Kim Cattrall as Lise
 Guy Marchand as Georges
 Jean-Pierre Marielle as Simon Labrosse
 Jacques Villeret as Jeremie
 Jean-Claude de Goros as Inspector Fox
 Tex Konig as Lasky

Box office
The film was the 16th highest-grossing movie of its year in France, and was the first time since 1976 that Belmondo has not delivered a top 10 hit movie.

Music
The music that Grimm plays in Rome is by Nino Rota from La strada (1954), which also features a clown as a main character.

Soundtrack
The soundtrack, composed by Serge Franklin, was released by Music Box Records and includes the complete score of Alexandre Arcady's Last Summer in Tangiers (1987).

References

External links 
 
 
 Hold Up at Le Film Guide
 Hold-Up -> ČSFD.cz

1985 films
1980s crime comedy films
1980s heist films
French crime comedy films
Canadian crime comedy films
French heist films
1980s French-language films
Comedy films about clowns
Films based on American novels
Films set in Montreal
Films directed by Alexandre Arcady
1985 comedy films
French-language Canadian films
1980s Canadian films
1980s French films
Films with screenplays by Francis Veber
Films based on novels by Jay Cronley